Euderces yucatecus is a species of beetle in the family Cerambycidae. It was described by Henry Walter Bates in 1892 and is known from Yucatán, Mexico.

References

Euderces
Beetles of North America
Insects of Mexico
Beetles described in 1892
Taxa named by Henry Walter Bates